Alopecurus pratensis, known as the meadow foxtail or the field meadow foxtail, is a perennial grass belonging to the grass family (Poaceae). It is native to Europe and Asia.

This common plant is found on grasslands, especially on neutral soils. It is found on moist, fertile soils, but avoids waterlogged, light or dry soils. The species forms dense swards leading to low botanical diversity.

This species is widely cultivated for pasture and hay, and has become naturalised in many areas outside its native range, including Australia and North America.

Description
It flowers from April until June – one of the earliest grasses to do so. Any survey work carried out in mid-summer may miss the grass as a result of this.

The stem is erect and hard at the shaft, the sheathes being smooth and cylindrical.

Similarity to other grassland species
Alopecurus pratensis has two common relatives, marsh foxtail (Alopecurus geniculatus) and black grass (A. myosuroides). It is often confused with timothy (Phleum pratense).  Timothy flowers later, from June until August. Its spikelets have twin hornlike projections arranged in cylindrical panicles, while meadow foxtail has a single soft awn.

Ecology
The caterpillars of some lepidopterans use it as a foodplant, e.g. the Essex skipper (Thymelicus lineola). Additionally, male mosquitoes can often be found on this flower drinking the nectar out of it.

It is a known host to fungi. These include:
 Cladosporium phlei
 Claviceps purpurea
 Erysiphe graminis
 Mastigosporium album
 Mastigosporium rubricosum
 Periconia hispidula
 Phaeoseptoria poae
 Rhynchosporium orthosporum

References

External links

Jepson Manual Treatment
USDA Plants Profile
Grass Manual Treatment
Purdue Horticulture Full Profile
Photo gallery

pratensis
Bunchgrasses of Asia
Bunchgrasses of Europe
Plants described in 1753
Taxa named by Carl Linnaeus